Trimma is a genus of fish in the family Gobiidae native to the Indian and Pacific Ocean. Together with members of the genus Eviota, they are known commonly as pygmygobies or dwarfgobies.

Species

There are currently 98 recognized species in this genus:
 Trimma abyssum G. R. Allen, 2015 (Deep-reef pygmygoby) 
 Trimma agrena R. Winterbottom & I. S. Chen, 2004 (Fishnet pygmygoby)
 Trimma anaima R. Winterbottom, 2000 (Sharp-eye pygmygoby) 
 Trimma annosum R. Winterbottom, 2003 (Grey-bearded pygmygoby) 
 Trimma anthrenum R. Winterbottom, 2006 (Honey-bee pygmygoby)
 Trimma aturirii R. Winterbottom, Erdmann & Cahyani, 2015 (Aturiri's pygmygoby) 
 Trimma avidori (Goren, 1978)
 Trimma barralli R. Winterbottom, 1995
 Trimma benjamini R. Winterbottom, 1996 (Ring-eye pygmygoby) 
 Trimma bisella R. Winterbottom, 2000
 Trimma burridgeae R. Winterbottom, 2016 
 Trimma caesiura D. S. Jordan & Seale, 1906 (Caesiura pygmygoby) 
 Trimma cana R. Winterbottom, 2004 (Candycane pygmygoby)
 Trimma capostriatum (Goren, 1981) (Spotted red-lined pygmygoby) 
 Trimma caudipunctatum T. Suzuki & Senou, 2009
 Trimma caudomaculatum Yoshino & Araga, 1975 
 Trimma cheni R. Winterbottom, 2011 (Face-stripe pygmygoby)
 Trimma chledophilum G. R. Allen, 2015 (Mud pygmygoby) 
 Trimma corallinum (J. L. B. Smith, 1959) (Polka-dot pygmygoby)
 Trimma corerefum R. Winterbottom, 2016 
 Trimma dalerocheila R. Winterbottom, 1984
 Trimma emeryi R. Winterbottom, 1985 (Emery's pygmygoby) 
 Trimma erdmanni R. Winterbottom, 2011 (Erdmann's pygmygoby)
 Trimma erwani Viviani, J. T. Williams & Planes, 2016 (Slanted pygmygoby) 
 Trimma fangi R. Winterbottom & I. S. Chen, 2004 (Spot-faced pygmygoby) 
 Trimma fasciatum T. Suzuki, Sakaue & Senou, 2012 
 Trimma filamentosus R. Winterbottom, 1995
 Trimma fishelsoni Goren, 1985
 Trimma flammeum (J. L. B. Smith, 1959)
 Trimma flavatrum K. Hagiwara & R. Winterbottom, 2007 (Wasp pygmygoby) 
 Trimma flavicaudatum (Goren, 1982)
 Trimma fraena R. Winterbottom, 1984
 Trimma fucatum R. Winterbottom & Southcott, 2007 (Harlot pygmygoby)
 Trimma gigantum R. Winterbottom & Zur, 2007 (Giant pygmygoby)
 Trimma grammistes (Tomiyama, 1936)
 Trimma griffithsi R. Winterbottom, 1984 (Griffiths' pygmygoby)
 Trimma habrum R. Winterbottom, 2011 (Delicate pygmygoby)
 Trimma haima R. Winterbottom, 1984
 Trimma haimassum R. Winterbottom, 2011 (Blood-spot pygmygoby)
 Trimma halonevum R. Winterbottom, 2000 (Red-spot pygmygoby)
 Trimma hayashii K. Hagiwara & R. Winterbottom, 2007 (Four-eye pygmygoby)
 Trimma helenae R. Winterbottom, Erdmann & Cahyani, 2014 (Helen's pygmygoby) 
 Trimma hoesei R. Winterbottom, 1984 (Fork-tail pygmygoby) 
 Trimma hollemani R. Winterbottom, 2016 
 Trimma hotsarihiensis R. Winterbottom, 2009 (Helen Reef pygmygoby)
 Trimma imaii T. Suzuki & Senou, 2009 (Imai's pygmygoby)
 Trimma insularum R. Winterbottom & Hoese, 2015 (Cocos pygmygoby) 
 Trimma irinae R. Winterbottom, 2014 (Irina's pygmygoby) 
 Trimma kardium R. Winterbottom, Erdmann & Cahyani, 2015 (Heart pygmygoby) 
 Trimma kitrinum R. Winterbottom & Hoese, 2015 (Citron pygmygoby) 
 Trimma kudoi T. Suzuki & Senou, 2008
 Trimma lantana R. Winterbottom & C. A. Villa, 2003 (Lantana pygmygoby) 
 Trimma lutea Viviani, J. T. Williams & Planes, 2016 (Yellow-barred pygmygoby) 
 Trimma macrophthalmus (Tomiyama, 1936) (Large-eye pygmygoby) 
 Trimma maiandros Hoese, R. Winterbottom & Reader, 2011 (Zigzag pygmygoby) 
 Trimma marinae R. Winterbottom, 2005 (Princess pygmygoby)
 Trimma matsunoi T. Suzuki, Sakaue & Senou, 2012 
 Trimma mendelssohni (Goren, 1978)
 Trimma meranyx R. Winterbottom, Erdmann & Cahyani, 2014 (Day-night pygmygoby) 
 Trimma meristum R. Winterbottom & Hoese, 2015 (Split-ray pygmygoby) 
 Trimma milta R. Winterbottom, 2002 (Red-earth pygmygoby) 
 Trimma multiclitellum G. R. Allen, 2015 (Multi-saddle pygmygoby) 
 Trimma nasa R. Winterbottom, 2005 (Nasal-bar pygmygoby) 
 Trimma nauagium G. R. Allen, 2015 (Shipwreck pygmygoby)  
 Trimma naudei J. L. B. Smith, 1957 (Naude's pygmygoby)
 Trimma necopinum (Whitley, 1959) (Australian pygmygoby) 
 Trimma nomurai T. Suzuki & Senou, 2007 (Lilac pygmygoby) 
 Trimma okinawae (Aoyagi, 1949) (Orange-red pygmygoby) 
 Trimma omanensis R. Winterbottom, 2000
 Trimma pajama R. Winterbottom, Erdmann & Cahyani, 2014 (Pajama pygmygoby) 
 Trimma panemorfum R. Winterbottom & Pyle, 2004
 Trimma papayum R. Winterbottom, 2011 (Pawpaw pygmygoby)
 Trimma pentherum R. Winterbottom & Hoese, 2015 (Mourning pygmygoby) 
 Trimma preclarum R. Winterbottom, 2006 (Exquisite pygmygoby) 
 Trimma quadrimaculatum Hoese, Bogorodsky & A. O. Mal, 2015 (Four-spotted pygmygoby) 
 Trimma randalli R. Winterbottom & Zur, 2007 (Randall's pygmygoby)
 Trimma readerae R. Winterbottom & Hoese, 2015 
 Trimma rubromaculatum G. R. Allen & Munday, 1995 (Red-spotted dwarfgoby)
 Trimma sanguinellus R. Winterbottom & Southcott, 2007 (Sanguinello pygmygoby)
 Trimma sheppardi R. Winterbottom, 1984 (Sheppard's pygmygoby)
 Trimma sostra R. Winterbottom, 2004 (Sostra pygmygoby)
 Trimma squamicana R. Winterbottom, 2004 (Candy-scale pygmygoby)
 Trimma stobbsi R. Winterbottom, 2001 (Stobb's pygmygoby) 
 Trimma striatum (Herre, 1945) (Red-lined pygmygoby) 
 Trimma tauroculum R. Winterbottom & Zur, 2007 (Bulls-eye pygmygoby)
 Trimma taylori Lobel, 1979 (Yellow pygmygoby) 
 Trimma tevegae Cohen & W. P. Davis, 1969 (Blue-stripe pygmygoby) 
 Trimma trioculatum R. Winterbottom, Erdmann & Cahyani, 2015 (Three-eyed pygmygoby) 
 Trimma unisquame (Gosline, 1959) (Black-margin pygmygoby) 
 Trimma volcana R. Winterbottom, 2003 (Volcano pygmygoby)
 Trimma winchi R. Winterbottom, 1984
 Trimma winterbottomi J. E. Randall & Downing, 1994 (Winterbottom's pygmygoby)
 Trimma woutsi R. Winterbottom, 2002
 Trimma xanthochrum R. Winterbottom, 2011 (Step-spot pygmygoby)
 Trimma xanthum R. Winterbottom & Hoese, 2015 (Yellow-red pygmygoby) 
 Trimma yanagitai T. Suzuki & Senou, 2007
 Trimma yanoi T. Suzuki & Senou, 2008 (Yano's pygmygoby)
 Trimma yoshinoi T. Suzuki, Ko. Yano & Senou, 2015 
 Trimma zurae R. Winterbottom, Erdmann & Cahyani, 2014 (Marg's pygmygoby)

References

 
Gobiidae
Marine fish genera
Taxa named by Alvin Seale
Taxa named by David Starr Jordan